The Gallagher index measures an electoral system's relative disproportionality between votes received and seats in a legislature. As such, it measures the difference between the percentage of votes each party gets and the percentage of seats each party gets in the resulting legislature, and it also measures this disproportionality from all parties collectively in any one given election. That collective disproportionality from the election is given a precise score, which can then be used in comparing various levels of proportionality among various elections from various electoral systems. The Gallagher index is a statistical analysis methodology utilised within political science, notably the branch of psephology.

Michael Gallagher, who created the index, referred to it as a "least squares index", inspired by the sum of squares of residuals used in the method of least squares. The index is therefore commonly abbreviated as "LSq" even though the measured allocation is not necessarily a least squares fit. The Gallagher index is computed by taking the square root of half the sum of the squares of the difference between percent of votes and percent of seats for each of the political parties.

   

The division by 2 gives an index whose values range between 0 and 100. The larger the differences between the percentage of the votes and the percentage of seats summed over all parties, the larger the Gallagher index. The larger the index value the larger the disproportionality and vice versa. Michael Gallagher included "other" parties as a whole category, and Arend Lijphart modified it, excluding those parties. Unlike the Loosemore–Hanby index, the Gallagher index is less sensitive to small discrepancies. Other indices measuring the proportionality between seat share and party vote share are the Loosemore–Hanby index, Rae index and the Sainte-Laguë Index.

Application in Canada 
The Gallagher index gained considerable attention in Canada in December 2016 in the context of efforts to reform Canada's electoral system. The Special Committee on Electoral Reform (a Parliamentary Committee) recommended "that the Government should, as it develops a new electoral system, use the Gallagher index in order to minimize the level of distortion between the popular will of the electorate and the resultant seat allocations in Parliament." The committee recommended that "the government should seek to design a system that achieves a Gallagher score of 5 or less."

Examples of calculating disproportionality

Canada
In the 2015 Canadian federal election, the Gallagher index was 12.02, where 0 would be a perfectly proportional election outcome.

Australia 
This table uses for example the 2012 Queensland state election, one of the largest landslides in Australian electoral history. Though Australia and New Zealand have somewhat similar political histories, Australia uses preferential voting in Single-member districts for Commonwealth House of Representative and most state and territory Legislative Assembly elections, which tends to result in far less proportionality compared to New Zealand's MMP system (or other proportional electoral systems), especially for larger minor parties, such as The Greens or, historically, the Australian Democrats. The 2012 Queensland election had an extremely high Gallagher Index, at 31.16, due to the massive landslide in seats for the victorious LNP. The LNP gained 88% of the seats with less than 50% of the vote. Most recent Australian state and federal elections however score between 10 and 12.

EU 
The 7 political groups of the European Parliament instead of the 203 political parties allow a concise calculation of disproportionality between votes and seats. The Gallagher index for the European Parliament is 7.87.

Sweden 
The disproportionality of the 2018 Swedish general election was 1.8 according to the Gallagher index, which is extremely low by international standards (resulting in almost perfectly proportional seat allocations), due to Sweden's use of the modified Sainte-Laguë method in elections to the Riksdag.

Republic of Ireland 
The disproportionality of the 2020 Irish general election was 1.96 according to the Gallagher index. The Republic of Ireland uses the single transferable vote (STV) system with Droop quota in elections to the Dáil Éireann.

United States 
This table uses the aggregate results of the 2016 elections to the United States House of Representatives.  These 435 single-seat elections are winner-take-all, which would tend to create disproportionate results, but this is moderated by the extremely high share of votes obtained by the two major parties—more than 97%, likely in part caused by fears of wasted votes and vote splitting. The Gallagher index ignores the effect of the primaries on the proportionality.

Countries 
The Gallagher indices for individual countries are listed below, only the last available index is shown.

See also 
 Democracy index
 V-Dem Democracy indices
 List of democracy indices

Notes

References

External links 

 Gallagher Index Made Easy
 The Gallagher Index: A Measure of Disproportionality
 Various Gallagher Indexes at Wikimedia Commons
 Website: Measuring Unfairness — Calculating Canada's Gallagher Index (This website includes the Gallagher Index in adjustable table format. It initially shows the data for Canada's 2015 federal election, but some variables in some table cells are adjustable by the visitor to the website, and then the rest of the table is automatically adjusted to reflect this visitor's new input).

Electoral systems
Psephology